The non-marine molluscs of Papua New Guinea are a part of the molluscan fauna of Papua New Guinea (fauna of New Guinea).

Freshwater gastropods

Land gastropods 

Hydrocenidae
 Hydrocena spiralis Wiktor, 1998

Diplommatinidae
 Palaina bundiana Wiktor, 1998

Cyclophoridae
 Dominamaria calvata Wiktor, 1998

Helicarionidae
 Cryptaustenia mirabilis Wiktor, 2002
 Cryptaustenia saltatoria Wiktor, 2002

Pupinidae
 Pupina bella Wiktor, 1998
 Pupina flexuosa Wiktor, 1998
 Pupina remota Wiktor, 1998
 Pupina variegata Wiktor, 1998

Camaenidae
 Papustyla pulcherrima Rensch, 1931

Caecidae
 Caecum directum Vannozzi, 2019
 Caecum frugi Vannozzi, 2019
 Caecum granulatum Vannozzi, 2019
 Caecum nasutum Vannozzi, 2019
 Caecum neoguineanum Vannozzi, 2019
 Caecum nofronii Vannozzi, 2019
 Parastrophia cornucopiae (de Folin, 1869)

Freshwater bivalves

See also
  – entire island.
 List of non-marine molluscs of Australia

References

External links

 
Papua
Moll
Papua New Guinea
Papua New Guinea
Papua New Guinea